Mirror Game is an Indian psychological thriller film written and directed by Vijit Sharma and produced by Rahula Kochar for Icelerate Films.  The film was released by PVR Pictures on 2 June 2017. The film stars Parvin Dabas, Pooja Batra and Omi Vaidya in lead roles.

Plot 

Mirror Game follows University, Professor Jay Verma. Stuck in a crumbling marriage and a failing career, Jay seeks a way out of his troubles. Ronnie, an ambitious student, approaches Professor Verma asking for help with a thesis. Verma sees this opportunity and in return for his help, makes Ronnie an offer that he hopes will solve all his problems. Ronnie accepts but soon things start to spiral out of control and Professor Verma begins to question his sanity.

Cast

 Parvin Dabas as Jay Verma
 Omi Vaidya as Vikram Jaykar
 Pooja Batra as Dr. Shonali Roy
 Sneha Ramachander as Det. Shenoy
 Shanti Akkineni as Tanya Verma
 Mandy Sidhu as Alisa
 Dhruv Bali as Ronnie Bhanot

Soundtrack 

The soundtrack for the film was largely made by mother-son duo Kasturi Nath Singh and Vishal J. Singh. Additional songs were contributed by Derick Gomes, Superzero and Esfand.

Awards 

This film has received the following awards:

Critical reception 
The film received mixed reviews. New Indian Express gave the film three stars and called it "an engaging, well-etched whodunit". Rohit Bhatnagar of The Deccan Chronicle described the film as "layered". Business Standard gave the film three stars.  Film Companion said the film was "semi-competent".  Asian Age reviewed the film positively, describing it as "engaging", as did IndiaGlitz.com.

References

External links 
 
 Mirror Game Official Website